Beltsville is a census-designated place (CDP) in northern Prince George's County, Maryland, United States. The community was named for Truman Belt, a local landowner. The 2020 census counted 20,133 residents. Beltsville includes the unincorporated community of Vansville.

Geography
Beltsville is located at  (39.037509, −76.917847), adjacent to the Montgomery County – Prince George's County line.

Climate
The climate in this area is characterized by hot, humid summers and generally mild to cool winters.  According to the Köppen Climate Classification system, Beltsville has a humid subtropical climate, abbreviated "Cfa" on climate maps.

Demographics

2020 census

Note: the US Census treats Hispanic/Latino as an ethnic category. This table excludes Latinos from the racial categories and assigns them to a separate category. Hispanics/Latinos can be of any race.

2000 Census
As of the census of 2000, there were 15,690 people, 5,690 households, and 3,823 families residing in Beltsville. The racial makeup of Beltsville was 48.20% White, 31.96% African American, 0.26% Native American, 10.75% Asian, 0.10% Pacific Islander, 5.42% from other races, and 3.31% from two or more races. Hispanic or Latino of any race were 9.84% of the population.

There were 5,690 households, out of which 32.4% had children under the age of 18 living with them, 49.0% were married couples living together, 13.5% had a female householder with no husband present, and 32.8% were non-families. 23.0% of all households were made up of individuals, and 5.1% had someone living alone who was 65 years of age or older. The average household size was 2.74 and the average family size was 3.27.

In Beltsville the population was spread out, with 23.6% under the age of 18, 10.3% from 18 to 24, 34.5% from 25 to 44, 22.6% from 45 to 64, and 8.9% who were 65 years of age or older. The median age was 35 years. For every 100 females, there were 94.5 males. For every 100 females age 18 and over, there were 91.8 males.

The median income for a household in Beltsville was $57,722, and the median income for a family was $66,087. Males had a median income of $40,914 with $35,645 for females. The per capita income for the CDP was $24,679. About 5.5% of families and 7.2% of the population were below the poverty line, including 5.4% of those under age 18 and 7.2% of those age 65 or over.

History

Beltsville's history dates back to 1649, when the land was part of an  land grant given to Richard Snowden I by Lord Baltimore of England. Snowden and his family were planters who established large plantations on which they built comfortable manor homes. Soon after, other settlers moved into the area, but they were farmers who could only afford a few acres of land and whose families lived in small cabins. The principal crop was tobacco, most of which was shipped to England. Because of the fertile soil and desirable growing conditions, the crops prospered.

Industry came to Beltsville in the early 18th century when iron ore was discovered in the area. The Muirkirk Iron Furnace on US 1 was established by Andrew and Elias Elliott, who learned their iron-making skills in Muirkirk, Scotland. They produced some of the best-quality pig iron in the country and supplied the U.S. Army with cannons, shot, wheels, and other iron products during the Revolutionary War and the Civil War.

By 1730, Post Road (now part of US 1) was the main thoroughfare through Beltsville. Though crude, it made stagecoach travel possible.  In 1783, Gabriel Peterson Van Horn established a stage line and built the Van Horn Tavern on Odell Road, where passengers could spend the night as they traveled between Baltimore and Washington. The trip took one and one-half days.

Beltsville has a distinguished Revolutionary War hero as its native son. Brigadier General Rezin Beall, who was born on Turkey Flight Plantation on Old Gunpowder Road in 1723, prevented a British invasion at Drum Point on the Chesapeake Bay with only 100 men. He is credited with the fact that there are no Revolutionary War battlefields in Maryland.

In 1835 one of the first rail lines in the country, the Washington branch of the B&O Railroad (Baltimore & Ohio), was built through Prince George's County. Coming from Baltimore, the line entered the county at Laurel and ran southwesterly to Bladensburg, then into Washington. B&O established a rail stop and freight depot on land purchased from a tobacco farmer named Trueman Belt, and they named the place after him. The new community of Beltsville was doubly blessed, for the Baltimore-Washington Turnpike crossed the rail line there. It soon became a thriving little trading center, eclipsing the older community of Vansville further north on the pike.

The original area developed haphazardly and consisted of a few residences, two churches, several small stores, a blacksmith, and a wheelwright. In 1891, the Beltsville Land Improvement Company was chartered and over the next thirty years developed the South Beltsville subdivision as a grid of streets. The developers sold the lots to individual owners and placed restrictive covenants on the deeds, including forbidding the manufacture or sale of alcohol and the sale of any property to an African American. Beltsville was marketed to professionals who wanted to escape the congestion of Washington and was developed with a mixture of Victorian-style houses and Colonial Revival houses. The community grew further when an electric railway was extended to Beltsville. The railway began as the Berwyn and Laurel Electric Railroad, but after suffering from financial difficulties it was acquired by the City and Suburban Railway. Located to the west of the railroad, along the line of present-day Rhode Island Avenue, the streetcar line served as the nucleus for additional subdivisions. These areas continued to develop slowly throughout the 1930s and 1940s with the construction of modest side-gable residences. Development continued after the introduction of the automobile, but it was not until after World War II that intensive development came to the Beltsville area.

As the federal government grew, in 1910 the U.S. Department of Agriculture (USDA) began to purchase land in Beltsville for its Agricultural Research Service, the main in-house research arm of the USDA. The land now houses the Henry A. Wallace Beltsville Agricultural Research Center (BARC). The Center eventually encompassed  and became the largest and most prominent center of agricultural science research in the world.

There are a number of historic homes and buildings still standing in Beltsville. The oldest home was built in 1773. One of the largest of the older buildings, built in 1880, was the three-story Ammendale Normal Institute, which was destroyed by fire in 1998.

In 2003 Kevin Kennedy started a group which aimed to have Beltsville incorporate into its own municipality. By 2004 the 12-member group, named Committee to Incorporate Beltsville, advocated for getting the issue on the ballot. By late 2004 the group began efforts to collect 3,000 signatures on a petition so the issue can be put up for election; this would represent about one quarter of the persons in Beltsville who were registered to vote. By the deadline in March 2005 they failed to get sufficient signatures as they only had 2,000.

Historic sites
The following is a list of historic sites in Beltsville and identified by the Maryland-National Capital Park and Planning Commission: African-American Heritage Sites at nearby Rossville are listed at Muirkirk, Maryland.

Government

Prince George's County Police Department District 6 Station in Beltsville CDP serves the community.

The U.S. Postal Service operates the Beltsville Post Office.

The Department of State operates the Beltsville Information Management Center.

The United States Secret Service James J. Rowley Training Center is nicknamed “Beltsville” but is actually located in adjacent Laurel.

Some of the most important research and bureaucratic facilities of the United States Department of Agriculture Agricultural Research Service (USDA ARS) are located here.

Education

Schools
Beltsville's public schools are a part of the Prince George's County Public Schools system.

Public elementary schools include:
 Beltsville Academy (K-8, formerly Beltsville Elementary School) on Wicomico Avenue
 Calverton Elementary School on Beltsville Road in Calverton CDP
 Vansville Elementary School (adjacent to the Beltsville CDP) on Ammendale Road

Public middle schools include:
 Beltsville Academy on Wicomico Avenue
 Martin Luther King Middle School on Ammendale Road

Public high schools include:
 High Point High School on Powder Mill Road

There are three parochial schools in Beltsville: Augsburg Academy (Lutheran), St Joseph's School (Roman Catholic of the Roman Catholic Diocese of Washington), and Beltsville Seventh-day Adventist (SDA).

During the era of legally-required racial segregation of schools, black students from Beltsville attended Lakeland High School in College Park in the period 1928-1950; Fairmont Heights High School, then near Fairmount Heights, replaced Lakeland High and served black students only from 1950 to 1964; around 1964 legally-required racial segregation of schools ended.

Libraries
Prince George's County Memorial Library System operates the Beltsville Branch.

Notable businesses
Ritz Camera Centers was headquartered in Beltsville. The chain included Ritz Camera, Wolf Camera, Kit's Camera, Inkley's, Cameras West, and The Camera Shop. The company also owned Boater's World Marine Centers, which was headquartered in the same building.  The company was acquired in 2012 and the Beltsville headquarters was closed.
Beltsville Speedway, defunct NASCAR track
Sinful Colors is headquartered in Beltsville

Notable people

Johnny Beall, MLB player
Matthew Centrowitz Jr., Olympic runner
Frank Cho, comic book writer and illustrator
Goatman, cryptid
Lyle Goodhue, scientist and inventor
Cameron Wake, NFL player

In popular culture
Experimental post-hardcore band Thrice recorded the album The Illusion of Safety here and dedicated a song to the town, named "The Beltsville Crucible".

References

External links

 Beltsville website (including links to The Beltsville News)
 Beltville Community Center and Recreation Council
 The History of Beltsville

 
Populated places established in 1649
Beltsville
Census-designated places in Maryland
Washington metropolitan area
1649 establishments in Maryland